EAGLES Academy Central High School (also known as EAGLES Academy Hollywood and EAGLES Center) was a public high school located in Hollywood, Los Angeles, with the target group of but not limited to gay, lesbian, bisexual, and transgender young people, as well as those questioning their sexuality and educational dropouts. It was founded and opened in 1992 along with the "Educational Options" program by the Los Angeles Unified School District (LAUSD) and closed down in 2004. It was the first public high school designed for LGBT youth from grade 7 onwards in the United States.

History
EAGLES Academy Central High School was a public high school run by the department of "Educational Options" of the LAUSD, also known as EAGLES Academy Hollywood and EAGLES Center. EAGLES is an acronym from "Emphasizing Adolescent Gay Lesbian Education Services." The target group of this school was gay, lesbian, bisexual, and transgender students, as well as those questioning their sexuality and educational dropouts, but being a high school run by the state, it was also open for straight students. The mission statement was A safe place for youth to receive their education.

The school was supervised by Ruben Zacarias, in that time period LAUSD's superintendent of schools in charge, Elizabeth Newman, the options administrator, and Sunshine S. Sepulveda, an educational advisor to LAUSD. Founder and principal of the school was Jerry B. Battey, an English teacher, from 1992 to 2004.

In 1996, the school had two campuses: Hollywood and a branch located in South Bay, Los Angeles.

In 1999, eleven teachers worked at EAGLES.

In the same year, there were also one full-time and four part-time volunteer school counselors.

The school was closed in the summer of 2004 due to financial shortages by the LAUSD. Although there was a tax-exempt organization called "Friends of EAGLES Center – Los Angeles, Inc." for raising money and commodity contributions, it was impossible to keep the school alive based only on donations.

Student body and activities
EAGLES Center started in 1992 with twelve students. Later in 1992, 35 students were enrolled at EAGLES.

EAGLES Center initiated the first prom for LGBT students for the school, open for students from other high schools in the school district. It was advertised in the media as an open invitation for the first prom of its kind in the nation. On May 20, 1994, it took place in the Los Angeles Hilton hotel. A group of protesters can be seen in the documentary film that was made on it.

At the first graduation ceremony held in Plummer Park in West Hollywood in 1994, six seniors received their diplomas.

Curriculum and external support
The curriculum followed the Carnegie Unit and Student Hour system with 45-minute units in core subjects like English, science, social studies, and mathematics plus German and Spanish as second languages.

A long-term collaboration between EAGLES and the California Institute of the Arts (CalArts) patronized several graduates to develop their talents like Marc Imme to become an actor, later known for the role of "Luke" in Ryan's Life (2004), and Miguel Lopez, the playwright of Mariposas (2001), a play for children.

In statewide comparisons, the students of EAGLE reached in the Junior to Senior ratings of 1998 (known as the "Stanford 9 Assessment tests") six stars.

Criticism
In 2001, some students graduated from EAGLES Academy without fulfilling all requirements.

Media
 EAGLES Center: Live to Tell: The First Gay and Lesbian Prom in America, a film by Charley Lang, VHS videocassette, color, 24 minutes, The Cinema Guild, New York City, 1995.

See also
LGBT culture in Los Angeles
Harvey Milk High School
Walt Whitman Community School

References

Alternative schools in the United States
Educational institutions established in 1995
High schools in Los Angeles
LGBT culture in Los Angeles
Defunct public high schools in California
2004 disestablishments in California
Educational institutions disestablished in 2004
LGBT and education
1995 establishments in California